Miskolci Vasutas Sport Club is a Hungarian football club from the town of Miskolc.

History
Miskolci VSC debuted in the 1958–59 season of the Hungarian League and finished thirteenth.

Name Changes 
1911–1948: Miskolci VSC
1925: merger with Miskolci MÁV Altisztköri Sport Club
1948–1949: Miskolci Vasutas SE (MVSE)
1949–1954: Miskolci Lokomotív SK
1954–1956: Miskolci Törekvés
1956–1993: Miskolci Vasutas Sport Club
1993: merger with Stop FC-Nagycsécs 
1993–1994: top-Miskolci VFC
1994–2009: Miskolci Vasutas Sport Club
2009–2011: Miskolci Vasutas Sport Club-MÁV Tiszavas
2011–present: Miskolci Vasutas Sport Club-TS Hungaria

References

External links
 Profile

Football clubs in Hungary
1909 establishments in Hungary